

Winners

2000s

2010s

2020s

References

Boston Society of Film Critics Awards
Film editing awards
Awards established in 2008